Anabel Acosta Islas (born 9 August 1980) is a Mexican politician. She served as senator for Sonora from 2015 until 2018 in the LXIII Legislature of the Mexican Congress.

A graduate of the Sonora Institute of Technology, she was a member of the Institutional Revolutionary Party.

References

Living people
1980 births
21st-century Mexican politicians
21st-century Mexican women politicians
Institutional Revolutionary Party politicians
Members of the Senate of the Republic (Mexico)
Women members of the Senate of the Republic (Mexico)
Sonora Institute of Technology alumni
Politicians from Sonora
People from Ciudad Obregón